Lingopie is a subscription-based VOD platform for language learning. The web-based software provides users with television shows and movies combined with interactive language-learning tools. Lingopie offers international content in 9 languages: Spanish, French, Italian, Portuguese, German, Russian, Japanese, Korean, and English. Lingopie offers a web version and a mobile app available for Android and Apple devices.

History 
Lingopie was founded by entrepreneurs David Datny and Roy Oppenheim after they met and discovered their similar experiences of learning a new language abroad through immersion. In an attempt to make language learning as entertaining as possible, the two came up with the idea of creating an app that teaches languages through foreign television shows and movies. 
 
David came up with the idea to create Lingopie when he moved to Israel. He started taking intensive lessons to learn Hebrew, but he wasn’t seeing significant progress, while his friends spoke perfect English. His friends suggested that he should watch TV to learn because, in Israel, the TV has same language captions. He noticed that when watching TV with subtitles he was slowly making progress while also having fun and enjoying the process.
 
After initial consultations with language academic Dr. Robert Vanderplank, from the University of Oxford, the method proved to be successful. Lingopie was officially launched in 2019.
 
Their latest funding was raised on March 1, 2020, from a Seed round. Lingopie is funded by two investors: Entrée Capital and MassChallenge.

Concept & Methodology 
Lingopie uses a method of language immersion by combining a VOD platform with language-learning tools and spaced repetition. Through viewing TV shows in native foreign languages, the learner is exposed to natural-sounding speaking and slang. The platform includes different types of content, such as TV shows, movies, audiobooks, and podcasts.
 
Lingopie’s main feature is its dual subtitles. Every show includes two sets of subtitles, one in the user’s native language and one in the target language. Users can click on the words they don’t know and obtain an instant translation. All the words the users click on become flashcards that they can later review and study. Users can also play minigames and quizzes to review. The video player includes other language-learning tools to facilitate the learning process, such as different video speed options  and features to practice their listening and speaking skills.
 
By subscribing to Lingopie, users can also participate in the community features, which include forums where users can reply to topics, create new ones, and interact among themselves, and a leaderboard, where they get ranked according to their watch time and flashcards saved.
 
Lingopie users can also subscribe to monthly one-on-one lessons with native teachers.

Lingopie Kids 
Lingopie Kids is a subsection of Lingopie launched in March 2022 for Spanish. The platform is geared towards children and contains the same learning tools as regular Lingopie, with content that is safe for kids and educational.

Lingopie Music 
Lingopie Music is a free product of Lingopie launched in April 2022. Instead of learning a language through TV shows, users can learn a language through music, having access to the same interface and language-learning tools as with regular Lingopie. As of July 2022, only Spanish, French, and German are available.

List of language pairs available 
As of March 2023, Lingopie is available for the following language pairs:

Content 
Lingopie has acquired content from several different independent producers and public broadcasting networks including RTVE, the largest public broadcasting network in Spain, Latino-owned Fuse Media, Japanese animation studio TMS, and German public-service television broadcaster ZDF, among others:
 
Spanish:
Caracol
TV Azteca
Pakapaka
Superights
Jetpack
Motion Pictures
Mondo TV
 
French:
Film and Pictures
Newen Studios
Mediawan
 
Japanese:
Fuji TV
TBS
 
Korean:
EBS
YTN
Grafizix
JEI TV
 
Russian:
Star Media
 
German:
Autentic
UCM.ONE
STUDIO HAMBURG
 
Italian:
Lux

Special Achievements 
In 2021, the company was among the ten Israeli startups selected for Google for Startups, a growth lab program launched by Google Israel in 2018 that now runs in 14 countries. The company graduated from the program in March 2022.

In 2022, Lingopie was chosen as one of the “top language learning solutions” by EdTech Digest for their EdTech Cool Tool Awards.

Reception 
As of June 2022, Trustpilot gave Lingopie a 4.8 “excellent” rating.

PC Magazine gave Lingopie a positive review, stating that it offers a competitively priced annual subscription, has quality videos, a lovely interface, and is great for intermediate and advanced learners.

Forbes commended Lingopie for "winning at customer retention" stating that their "retention rate is 79% after four months, higher than other subscription service giants like Netflix, HBO Max and Disney+."

References

External links 
 

Language learning software
Language-learning websites
Video on demand services
Education companies established in 2018
Android (operating system) software
IOS software
Israeli educational websites
Internet properties established in 2018
Companies based in Tel Aviv
Spaced repetition software